The Crowd is a 1951 Italian film.

Plot 
While a director is shooting a film, his aide (aka the assistant director) throws a bomb badly, sending the director, aide, and operator to the other world. Then the director thinks of making a film, which tells the story, highlighting how the crowd makes history. While the crowd raises its idols and then tears them down, the world is full of turncoats, who are serving their interests, deceiving the people. On the screen there are: Pontius Pilate and Jesus, vilified by the crowd. Richelieu, the French Revolution, the First Empire, Garibaldi, Cavour, Napoleon III, the Pope, the Duce, the Germans, the partisans and the armeggione, who juggles between one and the other, always staying afloat.

Cast
 Marie Glory (as Mary Gloria)
 Tino Buazzelli
 Gilberto Mazzi
 Olinto Cristina

External links
 

1951 films
1950s Italian-language films
Italian black-and-white films
1950s Italian films